The first season of Degrassi Junior High, a Canadian teen drama television series, aired in Canada from January 18, 1987 to May 3, 1987, consisting of thirteen episodes. The series follows the lives of a group of seventh and eighth grade school children attending the titular school as they face various issues and challenges such as child abuse, homophobia, teenage pregnancy, and body image. Filming for the season began on 8–10 July 1986 in Etobicoke, Ontario and wrapped in the winter of 1986.

The first season was broadcast on CBC Television on Sundays at 5:00pm. In the United States, the first season commenced airing on September 26, 1987 on PBS. In the United States, the first two seasons of the series were aired together as one twenty-six episode season. The season was released to DVD by WGBH Boston Home Video on February 1, 2005 in the United States, and by Force Entertainment on October 1, 2005 in Australia.

The season received a positive reception from critics, who acclaimed it as a realistic portrayal of teenagers that contrasted heavily with more moralistic, family-oriented programs of the time period. The episode "It's Late", where character Christine "Spike" Nelson becomes pregnant, would win an International Emmy for Children & Young People in November 1987. On the BBC in the United Kingdom, several episodes, including "It's Late", and "Rumour Has It", an episode about rumors of a teacher's homosexuality, were banned from airing, with the network ultimately not airing its second and third seasons..

Production 
Schoolteacher Linda Schuyler and her partner Kit Hood founded the company Playing With Time, Inc. in 1976, to produce short films and documentaries. In the late 1970s and early 1980s, Playing With Time produced a series of annual short films for CBC Television, beginning with 1979's Ida Makes a Movie, that implored the network to order a television series, which became known as The Kids of Degrassi Street. The series won several accolades during its run, including an International Emmy in 1986. Work on a series centering on a junior high school began in the early months of that year. 

Auditions took place throughout schools in Toronto; an estimated 300 kids auditioned and fifty-four were selected. The selected fifty-four would undergo a three-week workshop, that took place from 26 May to 13 June 1986, which helped them learn basic acting skills, techniques and improvisation and also included seminars in the behind-the-scenes aspects of production. The workshops would be repeated at the beginning of production for each season, as new cast members joined, and existing cast members underwent more advanced workshops. Characters would be developed based on the strengths of the actors and those who did exceptionally well would be given bigger roles. The actors comprised The Playing With Time Repertory Company which at its peak consisted of sixty-five kids. According to actress Stacie Mistysyn, who had previously starred on Kids as Lisa Canard and would return as Caitlin Ryan, the actors of Kids were offered a choice between playing new characters, or reprising their original roles; all except one actor chose to play new characters.

Schuyler and Hood saw Degrassi Junior High as a response to what they felt was a lack of television series that properly depicted teenagers, with the pair as well as critics citing family-oriented moralistic shows. Furthermore, Schuyler expressed dissatisfaction at the practice of casting older people to play teenagers prevalent in American teen media, and sought to cast real, inexperienced teenagers instead.

Broadcast

Canada 
Degrassi Junior High premiered on January 18, 1987 on CBC, airing at 5:00pm on Sundays. Critics who praised the show criticized the timeslot, feeling that the show deserved higher visibility. As a result, the series was moved to Mondays at 7:30pm, and then later a prime time slot at 8:30pm at the behest of Ivan Fecan, then the programming chief of CBC, who greatly acclaimed the series and wished he had ""20 more shows like it". Re-runs of the first season began airing in the Monday 8:30pm slot on September 28, 1987, until the premiere of the second season.

International 
In the United States, the Public Broadcasting Service (PBS) debuted the series on September 26, 1987, airing at 7:00pm on Saturdays. It debuted on WNET in New York City four days earlier, on September 22, airing at 6:00pm on Tuesdays. Both the first and second seasons were combined into one 26-episode season for the American market. In the United Kingdom, the show debuted BBC One at 5:05pm on April 5, 1988, airing on Wednesdays. However, several of its episodes, including "It's Late" (in which Spike finds out she is pregnant) and "Rumour Has It" (in which Caitlin questions her sexuality) were not aired on BBC One after parents allegedly complained that their content was "too strong" for children, and were instead aired at a 6pm timeslot on the BBC Two's DEF II programming strand. Ultimately, the second and third seasons were not aired in the United Kingdom, although actress Amanda Stepto would make promotional appearances in the UK in 1988 to promote the home video releases of the banned episodes. In Australia, the first season debuted on ABC TV on 8 February 1988, as part of The Afternoon Show hosted by James Valentine, where it aired on Mondays at 5:00pm.

Critical reception 
The first season was positively received by critics, who hailed it as a refreshingly realistic portrayal of teenage youth in contrast to other programs of the time. Critics felt that the series had successfully addressed adolescent issues while avoiding the "preachiness" of other socially-conscious television series, while also noting its balance of comedy with drama. Writing for the Times Colonist, Robert James said that Degrassi "is a place where there are no TV super dads, just a bunch of kids coping with the problems of growing up". Andrew Mickel of Den of Geek, reviewing its UK DVD release in 2007, rated it four out of five stars, stated that the show "more than holds up after twenty years" and said that despite the newer series addressing "harder-hitting" issues, the lengths the producers went for the original series made it "much more of a labour of love".

Episodes

Home media 
The season was released to DVD by WGBH Boston Home Video on February 1, 2005 in the United States, and by Force Entertainment on October 1, 2005 in Australia.

References

Sources 

 

1987 Canadian television seasons